HOME is an arts centre, cinema and theatre complex in Manchester, England.

HOME is an Arts Council England National Portfolio Organisation, registered as "Greater Manchester Arts Centre Limited" with the Charity Commission for England and Wales.  

In 2019, HOME was one of the most popular attractions in Manchester with c.900k visits, and Lonely Planet voted it one of the top 500 experiences in the UK ("one of Britain's best arts centres"). In 2021, HOME was named in the top 10 of TimeOuts 50 Best Cinemas in the UK and Ireland.

HOME welcomes over 650,000 visits per year with an annual programme that typically features over 10,000 events including:

 6,500 cinema screenings
 350 theatre performances
 20 exhibitions
 3,500 sessions through engagement, participation and talent development

HOME works with international and UK artists to produce work including drama, dance, film and contemporary visual art with a strong focus on Manchester, international work, new commissions, education, informal learning and talent development.

HOME trains all staff to be Carbon Literacy champions, as well as undertaking a range of activities to reduce environmental impacts, winning the award for 'Promotion of Environmental Sustainability' at the Manchester Culture Awards 2019.

History

The centre was formed by the merger of two Manchester-based arts organisations, Cornerhouse and the Library Theatre Company.

The project was funded by Manchester City Council, the Garfield Weston Foundation and Arts Council England.HOME Supporters HOME operates under a service contract with Manchester City Council to provide social benefit to the community.

The project was overseen by Dave Moutrey, former Director and Chief Executive of Cornerhouse, with Sarah Perks as Artistic Director for Visual Arts, Jason Wood as Artistic Director for Film and Walter Meierjohann as Artistic Director for Theatre.

The Library Theatre occupied most of the basement of Manchester Central Library and was the home of the Library Theatre Company, a Manchester City Council service. The library was built in 1934 and the theatre was originally a lecture theatre that since 1952 had been used by the theatre company. From 2010, the Library Theatre Company began performing at The Lowry arts centre in Salford. From 2014, it began operating as part of HOME before moving into the arts centre in May 2015.

In 2014, filmmaker Danny Boyle became a patron, along with actress and comedian Meera Syal, director Nicholas Hytner, novelist and poet Jackie Kay, filmmaker Asif Kapadia, actress Suranne Jones, artist Phil Collins and visual artist Rosa Barba.

Buildings
HOME occupies a site on First Street', Manchester. There are two performance venues - a 500-seat theatre and 150-seat flexible studio space - five cinema screens, gallery space to display contemporary art, café bar and restaurant. The centre is part of the development of a creative quarter in the city. The arts centre was designed by Mecanoo Architects based in Delft, Netherlands.

References

External links

2015 establishments in England
Art museums and galleries in Manchester
Buildings and structures in Manchester
Cinemas in Greater Manchester
Culture in Manchester
Performance art venues
Theatres in Manchester
Tourist attractions in Manchester